Tropidolaemus laticinctus is a species of venomous snake in the pit viper subfamily, Crotalinae. Its common names are Sulawesi pit viper, broad-banded temple pitviper, or broad-banded pit viper. It is endemic to the Indonesian island of Sulawesi.

Description
Unlike other temple viper species, this species lacks age-related and sexually dimorphic coloration.

References

Crotalinae
Reptiles of Sulawesi
Endemic fauna of Indonesia
Reptiles described in 2007